The 1993–94 Iraq FA Cup was the 17th edition of the Iraq FA Cup as a clubs-only competition. The tournament was won by Al-Zawraa for the second consecutive time and the ninth time in their history, beating Al-Talaba 1–0 in the final. The previous rounds saw Al-Zawraa beat Al-Falluja 11–0, Al-Karkh 1–0, Karbalaa 3–1 and Al-Shorta 4–1, while Al-Talaba beat Al-Hilla 9–0 and knocked out Al-Quwa Al-Jawiya 4–3 on penalties in the semi-finals after a 1–1 draw. Al-Zawraa also won the 1993–94 Iraqi National League to complete the double.

Bracket 
From the semi-finals onwards:

Matches

Semi-finals

Final

References

External links
 Iraqi Football Website

Iraq FA Cup
Cup